Euura proxima is a species of sawfly belonging to the family Tenthredinidae (common sawflies). The larvae feed on the leaves of willows (Salix species), creating galls and was described by Jean Guillaume Audinet-Serville in 1823.

Description of the gall
The gall is an ovoid, bean-shaped gall, up to 12 mm x 6 mm in size, with a hard thick red wall when occupied. The gall is formed when the female lays her eggs and injects a substance into the leaf. At first the galls are green and the walls soften as the larva consumes the tissue. Some galls may not be occupied, possibly because an egg was not laid or it did not hatch. There can be several galls to a leaf and they do not usually touch the midrib. Galls of E. proxima are found on white willow (S. alba), weeping willow (S. babylonica), S. x blanda, [[Salix excelsa|S. excelsa]], crack willow (S. fragilis) and bay willow (S. pentandra). There are two broods in a year with the first brood maturing around mid-summer and the second in the autumn.E. proxima is one of three closely related species in the Euura proxima group. The other members of the group are, 
 E. bridgmanii (Cameron, 1883)
 E. triandrae (Benson, 1941)

Inquilines
The following species are inquilines of E. proxima,
 Archarius salicivorus (Paykull, 1792) — the Archarius are weevils of the family Curculionidae. The female weevil lays an egg in the galls of Euura species, which eventually kills the original larva (but is not eaten). The weevil larva can be distinguished from the Euura larva by the lack of feet and lies in the shape of a horse-shoe. Pupation takes place in the ground and the autumn generation hibernates as an adult.
 A. crux (Fabricius, 1776) — There are two generations a year and the female weevil lays an egg in the galls of Euura species, and possibly this species. The larva will eat the original egg or the larva of the galling species. Pupation is in the ground and the autumn generation weevil hibernates through the winter.
 Euphranta toxoneura (Loew, 1846) — the Euphranta are fruit flies of the family Tephritidae. The larva of E. toxoneura feed in this gall and that of Euura bridgmanii'', first killing the host larva, which is evicted. The inquiline larva when fully grown leaves the gall and pupates in the soil.

Distribution
This species is found throughout Europe, north to southern Finland and east to the Caucasus. It has been introduced to Australia, North America and New Zealand.

References

External links
 Eurra proxima

Tenthredinidae
Gall-inducing insects
Hymenoptera of Australia
Hymenoptera of Europe
Hymenoptera of New Zealand
Hymenoptera of North America
Insects described in 1823
Taxa named by Jean Guillaume Audinet-Serville
Willow galls